Lipova is a commune in Bacău County, Western Moldavia, Romania. It is composed of seven villages: Lipova, Mâlosu, Satu Nou, Valea Caselor, Valea Hogei, Valea Mărului and Valea Moșneagului.

Natives
Gheorghe Vrănceanu (1900–1979), mathematician

References

Communes in Bacău County
Localities in Western Moldavia
Place names of Slavic origin in Romania